Medina of Taroudant is the oldest walled part in the city of Taroudant, Morocco.  It is classified as a national cultural heritage.

History 
Medina of Taroudant is the oldest part of the city of Taroudant.

City walls 
The medina is surrounded by a nearly 8 km long walls with more than 100 crenels.

Gallery

References 

Medinas of Morocco
Taroudant